The nobles of Turopolje or nobles of the plain formed a group of conditional nobles in Slavonia within the Kingdom of Hungary from the second half of the 13th century to the middle of the 19th century. They lived in a self-governing "noble peasant community" and were exempted of taxation. They were partisans of the Croatian-Hungarian Party in the 1830s and 1840s. They were named after the region of Turopolje south of Zagreb.

History
The nobles of Turopolje descended from castle warriors (nobiles iobagiones) of Zagreb County who received special privileges as a community in the second half of the 1270s. Thereafter they were exempted of taxation and were entitled to elect judges to hear their legal cases. Their lands were located in the territory bordered by the rivers Kupa and Sava and the Vukomerec Hills, south of Zagreb. The "sandaled nobles of Turopolje" were not "true noblemen of the realm", thus the Sabor or parliament denied their right to vote at its sessions from the 1750s. However, their right to send representatives to the Sabor was confirmed by the Court Chancellery of the Kingdom of Hungary in 1830. Thereafter they represented the interests of the central government in Slavonia, against the Illyrian Party which stated that Croatia was a separate realm, not part of the Kingdom of Hungary.

See also
 Castle warrior
 Nobility in the Kingdom of Hungary

Footnotes

References
 Feldman, Andrea (2004). Imbro Tkalac: Memoirs of Boyhood in Nineteenth Century Croatia. In: Naumović, Slobodan; Jovanović, Miroslav; Childhood in South East Europe: Historical Perspectives on Growing Up in the 19th and 20th Centuries. Lit Verlag. .
 Magaš, Branka (2008). Croatia through History: The Making of a European State. Saqi Books. 
 Péter, László (2012). Hungary's Long Nineteenth Century: Constitutional and Democratic Traditions in a European Perspective (Collected Studies, Edited by Miklós Lojkó). BRILL. .
 
 Rady, Martyn (2000). Nobility, Land and Service in Medieval Hungary. Palgrave (in association with School of Slavonic and East European Studies, University College London). .

Conditional nobility (Kingdom of Hungary)
Croatian nobility